Aaron's Blood is a 2016 American horror film directed by Tommy Stovall and starring James Martinez. It was written and directed by Tommy Stovall.

Premise
Aaron is the single father of his 12-year-old hemophiliac son Tate, who is made into a vampire thanks to a blood transfusion.

Cast

Critical reception
The Los Angeles Times called it "so bad". According to The Hollywood Reporter, "the film's aesthetic and narrative shortcomings will be too large a hurdle for many viewers to leap".

References

External links 

2016 horror films